From 20 to 21 October 1999, the People's Consultative Assembly (MPR), the legislative branch of Indonesia, met to elect both the president and vice president of the country for a five-year term. The incumbent president, B. J. Habibie, declined to stand for re-election. On 20 October, Abdurrahman Wahid, chairman of the Nahdlatul Ulama, was elected president and inaugurated on the same day. Wahid's opponent, Megawati Sukarnoputri was subsequently elected vice president the next day. The elections represented the first relatively democratic and peaceful transfer of power in the history of Indonesia.

Background
In October, the People's Consultative Assembly made up of the People's Representative Council and 200 nominated members from the military and selected civilians, a total of 700, met to elect the President and Vice President.

There were initially four candidates for the presidency; Abdurrahman Wahid, B. J. Habibie, Megawati Sukarnoputri, and Yusril Ihza Mahendra. However Habibie refused the nomination from Golkar after his accountability speech was rejected by the MPR the day before election, while Yusril withdrew his candidacy on election day.

Election day
On 20 October Abdurrahman Wahid, chairman of the PKB was elected, beating Megawati Sukarnoputri by 373 votes to 313, although her party (PDI-P) won the most votes in the legislative election and had one-third of the parliamentary seats. This triggered riots among Megawati's supporters. The following day, Megawati was nominated by Gus Dur's party (PKB) as vice president and got elected, beating Hamzah Haz from the PPP by 396 votes to 284. This ended the street protests.

This was the first and last democratically indirect presidential election in Indonesia and the first presidential election that did not feature a candidate from ruling-party (Golkar).

Result

President

Vice president

References

Presidential elections in Indonesia
Indonesia
Legislative